(30 March 1938 – 8 November 2013) was an enka singer and TV presenter in Japan. She was considered "the Goddess of Enka".

Career
Chiyoko was born in Shinagawa Ward, Tokyo, Japan.  In 1954 Chiyoko won the 1st prize of the Columbia Music Entertainment singers competition. In 1955, she made her recording début with the single "Konoyo no Hana". She was an Enka singer who appeared in Kohaku Uta Gassen, starring 35 times. However, she forgot her song lyrics in 1996. She participated again in the Kohaku in 2004.

Death

After a long battle with liver cancer, she died, at age 75, on 8 November 2013.

Discography
Konoyo no Hana (この世の花) (1955): The Fruit and Bloom in the world : Chiyoko herself is featured in the movie of the same name.
Tōkyō Dayo Okkasan (東京だョお母さん) (1957) : Mummy, here we are in Tōkyō.
Jinsei Iroiro (人生いろいろ) (1987)
(Best selling single of hers, selling over 1 million copies, peaking at No.16 on weekly Oricon chart)

Filmography
 A Farewell to the Woman Called My Sister (別れの茶摘歌　姉妹篇　お姉さんと呼んだ人 Wakare no chatsumi-uta shimai-hen: Oneesan to yonda hito) (1957)

References

External links 

1938 births
People from Shinagawa
2013 deaths
Enka singers
Singers from Tokyo
Nippon Columbia artists
Deaths from liver cancer
Deaths from cancer in Japan
20th-century Japanese musicians
Recipients of the Medal with Purple Ribbon
20th-century Japanese women singers
20th-century Japanese singers